Radius (Jared Corbo) is a fictional superhero appearing in American comic books published by Marvel Comics. He is a former member of the superhero team Alpha Flight. He first appeared in Alpha Flight: In The Beginning #-1, and first appeared as Radius in Alpha Flight vol. 2 #1 (both published in 1997).

Fictional character biography

Jared and his younger half-brother Adrian (later code named Flex) were raised in the Hull House orphanage, which was actually a facility operated by the Canadian government's secretive Department H. While Adrian became shy, reserved and bookish, Jared became athletically inclined, aggressive, and arrogant. Both brothers manifested mutant powers after puberty: Adrian gained the ability to transform parts of his body into blades, while Jared manifested a personal force field that could not be shut down. Jared rejects the initial flirtations of his teammate Murmur for personal reasons.

Later, he is sent with to corral the mutant Wolverine, whom the entire team believes has killed the ex-Alpha Flight member Box. This was part of the lies and mind-control that Department H was using on the entire team. Jared's bravado, when the team corrals Wolverine, is met with shock by Adrian, who has a high level of respect for the man. Jared stands up to Wolverine's intimidation tactics, but soon a fight breaks out anyway. Backup X-Men soon join in. It is Adrian, though, who calms things down by wanting to talk instead of fight. Various discrepancies in the mission lessen the Alphans desire to do battle.

The brothers were recruited into a new incarnation of the Canadian superhero team Alpha Flight.

They assist the new Alpha Flight in battling several foes, including the Zodiac organization and  the Brass Bishop. The Bishop is found by Alpha Flight after many innocent civilians go missing. He has brainwashed them and is building a Tower of Babel, an enormous structure that is intended to reach heaven. The team also confronts Department H's own power-mad leader, Jeremy Clarke, who dies of radiation poisoning during a Zodiac raid on the Department H headquarters. Their Alpha Flight team fight several members of the original Flight and later team up with them to defeat a new Weapon X, who had been created by a rogue Department H scientist. Both groups of Alphans merged into a unified Alpha Flight following this adventure. The Corbo brothers and several other members of the new team were later reassigned to Alpha Flight's trainee team, Beta Flight.

Radius is later hired by X-Corps, a militaristic strike force founded by former Generation X headmaster and former X-Man Sean Cassidy, a.k.a. Banshee. The X-Corps was ultimately betrayed by its criminal members. Radius is defeated when the villain Avalanche opens a chasm beneath him. Jared survived the fall, though, and has been shown as one of the many depowered mutants in the aftermath of M-Day.

It was later revealed that Unus the Untouchable was Radius' father after Flex starts searching for their fathers through their adoption agency. It has long been rumored that Carmella Unuscione of the Acolytes is the daughter of Unus. It is currently unknown if the two are siblings, some other relation or altogether unrelated.

Powers and abilities
Radius, before being depowered, could generate a permanent force field around him. He does not feel the impact of blows upon it. While the shield is generally porous enough for him to breathe, he can make it almost impervious, even to air.

He could also create extensions of the field to use as a ranged attack, and brace objects against it to "fake" super-strength.

Ralphie Hutchins

Bibliography
Alpha Flight vol. 2 #-1, 1-20
Uncanny X-Men #355, 401-404
Wolverine vol. 2 #142

Footnotes

External links
AlphaFlight.Net Alphanex Entry On - Radius
Discuss Radius on the Alpha Waves Forum
Uncannyxmen.net Character Profile on Radius

Canadian superheroes
Comics characters introduced in 1997
Fictional characters with energy-manipulation abilities
Marvel Comics male superheroes
Marvel Comics mutants
Marvel Comics orphans
Characters created by Steven T. Seagle